Birgitte Karlsen Hagen (born 19 April 1994) is a Norwegian handball player who plays for  Tertnes HE.

She also represented Norway in the 2013 Women's Junior European Handball Championship, placing 4th, and in the 2014 Women's Junior World Handball Championship, placing 9th.

References

1994 births
Living people
Sportspeople from Bergen
Norwegian female handball players
Expatriate handball players
Norwegian expatriate sportspeople in Denmark
21st-century Norwegian women